Jagalchi Fish Market is a fish market in the neighborhood of Nampo-dong in Jung-gu, and Chungmu-dong, Seo-gu, Busan, South Korea.  The market is located on the edge of Nampo Port (남포항), Busan. It is considered to be the largest fish market in South Korea. 

The name is said to have originated from jagal (자갈 gravel in Korean) because the market used to be surrounded by gravel. This is one of the ten landmarks of Busan, so many tourists visit there to shop.

The market is known for the “Busan wives”.  They are known for their strong will determination to provide financial support for their family and pay for their children’s education. Another name for these women is jagalchi ajumma. It references back to when these women would peddle the street selling goods after the Korean War. The market hosts the Busan Jagalchi Festival in autumn. The festival’s slogan is “Oiso! Boiso! Saiso!” (“Come! See! Buy!”). Individuals can participate in singing, dancing, catching fish, and eating fresh fish.

Various good are found in this market, which spans 3 kilometers. Near the Yeongdo Grand Bridge can be found dehydrated anchovies, sea laver, and various shellfish. Across from the city hall, shops sell herbal medicine and animal-based remedies.

Gallery

See also

List of markets in South Korea
List of South Korean tourist attractions

References

External links

Official site 

Retail markets in Busan
Fish markets
Jung District, Busan
Buildings and structures in Busan